Cristian Cirlan is a Moldovan footballer who plays in the Moldovan National Division.

References

External links

1995 births
Living people
Moldovan footballers
FC Veris Chișinău players
FC Sfîntul Gheorghe players
Association football midfielders